La Digue is a 1911 silent French film directed by Abel Gance. It was Gance's debut film. The film was never released.

Cast
 Robert Lévy
 Paulette Noizeux
 Pierre Renoir
 Jean Toulout

References

External links

1911 films
1910s French-language films
French silent short films
French black-and-white films
Films directed by Abel Gance
Lost French films
Unreleased films
1911 short films
1911 directorial debut films
1910s French films